Allagelena opulenta is a species of funnel weaver spider of the family Agelenidae.  The species was first described by Ludwig Carl Christian Koch in 1878.

A. opulenta is native to Japan, China, Korea, and Taiwan. It is similar in appearance to A. bistriata but can be distinguished by a number of features including the structure of its patella and the shape of its retrolateral tibial apophysis.

Its venom is used to make the insecticidal toxin agelenin.

References

External links

Agelenidae
Spiders of Asia
Spiders of China
Chelicerates of Japan
Arthropods of Korea
Spiders of Taiwan
Spiders described in 1878
Taxa named by Ludwig Carl Christian Koch